St. Stanislaus Forane Church is an active Syro-Malabar church located in Mala, Thrissur district, in Kerala, India.

History 
The church is reputed to be the only church in Asia which has as its patron St Stanislaus Kostka (28 October 1550 – 15 August 1568), a Polish saint and was built in 1840.  The land for this church was donated by well known person from thettayil kadicheeni family as a respect his body is buried inside the church.

References

Churches in Thrissur district
Syro-Malabar Catholic church buildings